The Alternative Energy Development Board (AEDB) is the sole representing agency of the Federal Government that was established in May 2003 with the main objective to facilitate, promote and encourage development of Renewable Energy in Pakistan and with a mission to introduce Alternative and Renewable Energies (AREs) at an accelerated rate. The administrative control of AEDB was transferred to Ministry of Water and Power in 2006.

The Government of Pakistan has inter alia mandated AEDB to:-
Implement policies, programs, and projects through the private sector in the field of ARE
Assist and facilitate development and generation of ARE to achieve sustainable economic growth
Encourage transfer of technology and develop indigenous manufacturing base for ARE Technology
Promote provision of energy services that are based on  ARE resources
Undertake ARE projects on commercial scale (AEDB Act 2010)

The Government of Pakistan has tasked the AEDB to ensure 5% of total national power generation capacity to be generated through renewable energy technologies by 2030. In addition, under the remote village electrification program, AEDB has been directed to electrify 7,874 remote villages in Sindh and Balochistan provinces through ARE technologies.
The Federal Government established AEDB as a statutory organization by announcing and promulgating the AEDB Act in May 2010. The Act bestowed upon AEDB the authorities and the responsibilities for the promotion and development of AREs.

Although, the AEDB is administrated through the appointed chairman and chief executive officer; all policies and funding research is overseen by the prime minister.

Currently the organization's progress is being heard and examined in the Supreme Court of Pakistan.

See also 

 List of electric supply companies in Pakistan
 Electricity in Pakistan
 Electricity sector in Pakistan
 List of electric supply companies in Pakistan
 Water and Power Development Authority
 Economy of Pakistan
 Water and Power Development Authority
 National Electric Power Regulatory Authority
 Karachi Electric Supply Company

References

External links
 

Pakistan federal departments and agencies
2003 establishments in Pakistan
Government agencies established in 2003
Renewable energy in Pakistan